"Love U" is a song by South Korean singer Chungha, serving as the lead single of her third EP, Blooming Blue.

Composition
The breezy “Love U” is guided by fizzy synths and bright melodies as Chungha expresses her desire. “I just wanna, wanna love you,” she croons during the chorus.

Music video
In the music video for "Love U," Chungha is seen reflecting on the passion that she feels and wishing upon falling stars and glowing stones as she dreams of her romance. Much of the song is relayed as the singer spends time looking into the camera, ostensibly acting as the perspective of her beloved, roaming around looking at nature, and performing the song's vibrant, hip-shaking choreography.

Charts

Weekly charts

Year-end charts

Accolades

Notes

References

2018 singles
2018 songs
Chungha songs
MNH Entertainment singles
Korean-language songs